The Textron Tower, formerly the Old Stone Tower, is a modern skyscraper in downtown Providence, Rhode Island. It is the world headquarters of Textron. At , the Textron Tower stands as the 5th-tallest building in the city and the state.

Architecture 
The Textron Tower was designed by Shreve, Lamb & Harmon, architects of the Empire State Building. The structure is set back some from the building line and raised above the street on a podium. The first story is marbled sheathed and serves as a base for the concrete-grid curtain wall.  The building features deep reveals attached to a reinforced concrete frame and is clad with deeply exposed aggregate precast panels.

The structure was included in a 2020 Business Insider article entitled The ugliest skyscraper in every state.

References 

International style architecture in Rhode Island
Office buildings completed in 1972
Skyscraper office buildings in Providence, Rhode Island
Textron
1972 establishments in Rhode Island